Jacqueline Kgang (born 27 September 1996) is a Botswanan cricketer who plays for the women's national cricket team. She made her Women's Twenty20 International (WT20I) debut for Botswana on 6 June 2021, against Rwanda, at the 2021 Kwibuka Women's T20 Tournament in Rwanda. 

In August 2021, Kgang was named as a member of the Botswanan team, ahead of the 2021 ICC Women's T20 World Cup Africa Qualifier tournament.

References

External links
 

1996 births
Living people
Botswana cricketers
Botswana women Twenty20 International cricketers
People from Kgatleng District